Ordu is an electoral district of the Grand National Assembly of Turkey. It elects six members of parliament (deputies) to represent the province of the same name for a four-year term by the D'Hondt method, a party-list proportional representation system.

The capital of the province is the city of Ordu.

Members 
Population reviews of each electoral district are conducted before each general election, which can lead to certain districts being granted a smaller or greater number of parliamentary seats.

Ordu is a borderline electoral district, with its representation varying between six and eight members since the late 1970s. As of the 2011 general election it has elected six members, down from seven seats at the previous election.

Ordu is the seat of the former Interior Minister, İdris Naim Şahin.

General elections

2011

Presidential elections

2014

References 

Electoral districts of Turkey
Politics of Ordu Province